The 20th G7 Summit was held in Naples, Italy, on July 8–10, 1994.  The venue for the summit meetings was the former Royal Palace in Naples.
 
The Group of Seven (G7) was an unofficial forum which brought together the heads of the richest industrialized countries: France, Germany, Italy, Japan, the United Kingdom, the United States, Canada (since 1976), and the President of the European Commission (starting officially in 1981). The summits were not meant to be linked formally with wider international institutions; and in fact, a mild rebellion against the stiff formality of other international meetings was a part of the genesis of cooperation between France's president Valéry Giscard d'Estaing and West Germany's chancellor Helmut Schmidt as they conceived the first Group of Six (G6) summit in 1975.

Leaders at the summit
The G7 is an unofficial annual forum for the leaders of Canada, the European Commission, France, Germany, Italy, Japan, the United Kingdom, and the United States.

The 20th G7 summit was the first summit for Canadian Prime Minister Jean Chrétien, Italian Prime Minister Silvio Berlusconi, and Japanese Prime Minister Tomiichi Murayama. It was also the last summit for French President François Mitterrand.

Participants
These summit participants are the current "core members" of the international forum:

Agenda

The first night of the summit included a working dinner for the international leaders. The event was organized in the dramatic setting of Castel dell'Ovo at the waters' edge of the Bay of Naples.

Issues
The summit was intended as a venue for resolving differences among its members. As a practical matter, the summit was also conceived as an opportunity for its members to give each other mutual encouragement in the face of difficult economic decisions. Issues which were discussed at this summit included:
 Jobs and economic growth
 Trade
 Environment
 Developing countries
 Nuclear safety
 Ukraine
 Russia
 Other countries in transition
 Cooperation against transnational crime and money laundering

Gallery

See also
 G8

Notes

References
 Bayne, Nicholas and Robert D. Putnam. (2000).  Hanging in There: The G7 and G8 Summit in Maturity and Renewal. Aldershot, Hampshire, England: Ashgate Publishing. ; OCLC 43186692
 Reinalda, Bob and Bertjan Verbeek. (1998).  Autonomous Policy Making by International Organizations. London: Routledge.  ; ;

External links
 No official website is created for any G7 summit prior to 1995 -- see the 21st G7 summit.
 University of Toronto: G8 Research Group, G8 Information Centre
 G7 1994, Delegations & Documents

G7 summit
1994 in international relations
G7 summit
G7 summit 1994
20th century in Naples
G7 summit 1994
1994
July 1994 events in Europe